Estadio 5 de Septiembre  is a multi-use stadium in Cienfuegos, Cuba.  It is used mostly for baseball games and is the home stadium of Cienfuegos Camaroneros.  The stadium holds 15,600 people. It opened on 9 January 1977.

References

1977 establishments in Cuba
Baseball venues in Cuba
Buildings and structures in Cienfuegos
Sports venues completed in 1977
20th-century architecture in Cuba

es:Estadio Cinco de Septiembre